The Delaware, Lackawanna and Western Railroad Water Gap Station is located in Delaware Water Gap, Monroe County, Pennsylvania. Service to Delaware Water Gap along what became known as the Delaware, Lackawanna and Western Railroad started on May 13, 1856. The station structure was designed by architect Frank J. Nies and built in 1903. It consists of two separate one-story brick buildings, a station house and freight house, joined by a common concrete platform and slate covered hipped roof.  It is reflective of the Late Victorian style.  The station closed to passenger service in March 1953, and was sold to the Borough in 1958. It is said to sit just outside Delaware Water Gap National Recreation Area, though it appears within the area's boundary on maps.

The station was added to the National Register of Historic Places on November 27, 2002.

See also
National Register of Historic Places listings in Monroe County, Pennsylvania

References

Railway stations on the National Register of Historic Places in Pennsylvania
Railway stations in the United States opened in 1856
Railway stations in Monroe County, Pennsylvania
Former Delaware, Lackawanna and Western Railroad stations
National Register of Historic Places in Monroe County, Pennsylvania